This is a list of films that won awards at the American Sundance Film Festival.


1980s

1984
Grand Jury Prize Dramatic – Old Enough
Grand Jury Prize Documentary – Style Wars
Honorable Mention Documentary – Seeing Red
Honorable Mention Documentary – The Good Fight (The Abraham Lincoln Brigade in the Spanish Civil War)
Special Jury Prize Dramatic – Last Night at the Alamo
Special Jury Prize Documentary – When the Mountains Tremble
Special Jury Recognition Documentary – The Secret Agent
Special Jury Recognition Dramatic – Hero
Source:

1985
Grand Jury Prize Dramatic – Blood Simple
Grand Jury Prize Documentary – Seventeen
Special Jury Prize Dramatic – Almost You
Special Jury Prize Dramatic – The Killing Floor
Special Jury Prize Documentary – America and Lewis Hine
Special Jury Prize Documentary – Kaddish
Special Jury Prize Documentary – Streetwise
Special Jury Prize Documentary – The Times of Harvey Milk
Special Jury Recognition Dramatic – Stranger Than Paradise
Special Jury Recognition Documentary – In Heaven There Is No Beer?
Sources:

1986
Grand Jury Prize Dramatic – Smooth Talk
Grand Jury Prize Documentary – Private Conversations
Special Jury Prize Dramatic – Desert Hearts
Special Jury Prize Documentary – The Mothers of Plaza de Mayo
Special Jury Recognition – Parting Glances
Special Jury Recognition – The Great Wall is a Great Wall
Special Jury Recognition for Youth Comedy – Seven Minutes in Heaven
Source:

1987
Grand Jury Prize Dramatic – Waiting for the Moon
Grand Jury Prize Dramatic – The Trouble with Dick
Grand Jury Prize Documentary – Sherman's March
Excellence in Cinematography Award Dramatic – No Picnic
Excellence in Cinematography Award Documentary – Chile: When Will It End?
Special Jury Recognition – Working Girls
Special Jury Recognition – River's Edge
Special Jury Prize Documentary – Chile: When Will It End?
Special Jury Prize for Originality – Sullivan's Pavilion
Source:

1988
Grand Jury Prize Dramatic – Heat and Sunlight
Grand Jury Prize Documentary – Beirut: The Last Home Movie
Excellence in Cinematography Award Dramatic – Rachel River
Excellence in Cinematography Award Documentary – Beirut: The Last Home Movie
Special Jury Prize – Lemon Sky
Special Jury Prize Documentary – Thy Kingdom Come, Thy Will Be Done
Special Jury Prize Documentary – Dear America: Letters Home from Vietnam
Special Jury Prize for Acting – Viveca Lindfors in Rachel River
Special Jury Recognition – The Brave Little Toaster
Source:

1989
Grand Jury Prize Dramatic – True Love
Grand Jury Prize Documentary – For All Mankind
Audience Award Documentary – For All Mankind
Audience Award Dramatic – sex, lies and videotape
Filmmakers Trophy Dramatic – Powwow Highway
Filmmakers Trophy Documentary – John Huston
Special Jury Recognition – The Roommate
Source:

1990s

1990
Grand Jury Prize Dramatic – Chameleon Street
Grand Jury Prize Documentary – H-2 Worker
Grand Jury Prize Documentary – Water and Power
Excellence in Cinematography Award Documentary – H-2 Worker
Excellence in Cinematography Award Dramatic – House Party
Filmmakers Trophy Dramatic – House Party
Filmmakers Trophy Documentary – Metamorphosis: Man Into Woman
Audience Award Dramatic – Longtime Companion
Audience Award Documentary – Berkeley in the Sixties
Special Jury Recognition – To Sleep with Anger
Special Jury Recognition – Samsara: Death and Rebirth in Cambodia
Source:

1991
Grand Jury Prize Dramatic – Poison
Grand Jury Prize Documentary – American Dream
Grand Jury Prize Documentary – Paris Is Burning
Filmmakers Trophy Dramatic – Privilege
Filmmakers Trophy Documentary – American Dream
Audience Award Dramatic – One Cup of Coffee
Audience Award Documentary – American Dream
Excellence in Cinematography Award Dramatic – Daughters of the Dust 
Excellence in Cinematography Award Documentary – Christo in Paris
Special Jury Recognition – Straight Out of Brooklyn
Waldo Salt Screenwriting Award – Hangin' with the Homeboys
Waldo Salt Screenwriting Award – Trust
Source:

1992
Grand Jury Prize Dramatic – In the Soup
Grand Jury Prize Documentary – A Brief History of Time
Grand Jury Prize Documentary – Finding Christa
Filmmakers Trophy Dramatic – Zebrahead
Filmmakers Trophy Documentary – A Brief History of Time
Audience Award Dramatic – The Waterdance
Audience Award Documentary – Brother's Keeper
Excellence in Cinematography Award Dramatic – Swoon
Excellence in Cinematography Award Documentary – Shoot for the Contents
Special Jury Recognition – The Hours and Times
Special Jury Recognition – My Crasy Life
Special Jury Prize for Acting – Seymour Cassel for his performance in In the Soup
Waldo Salt Screenwriting Award – The Waterdance
Piper-Heidseick Award for Independent Vision – John Turturro
Source:

1993
Grand Jury Prize Dramatic – Ruby in Paradise
Grand Jury Prize Dramatic – Public Access
Grand Jury Prize Documentary – Silverlake Life: The View from Here
Filmmakers Trophy Dramatic – 
Audience Award Dramatic – El Mariachi
Audience Award Documentary – Something Within Me
Excellence in Cinematography Award Dramatic – An Ambush of Ghosts
Excellence in Cinematography Award Documentary – Children of Fate: Life and Death in a Sicilian Family
Waldo Salt Screenwriting Award – Combination Platter
Special Jury Recognition – Just Another Girl on the I.R.T.
Special Jury Recognition – Earth and the American Dream
Piper-Heidsieck Tribute to Independent Vision – Denzel Washington
Source:

1994
Grand Jury Prize Dramatic – What Happened Was...
Grand Jury Prize Documentary – Freedom on My Mind
Filmmakers Trophy Dramatic – Clerks
Filmmakers Trophy Dramatic – Fresh
Filmmakers Trophy Documentary – Theremin: An Electronic Odyssey
 Waldo Salt Screenwriting Award –  What Happened Was...
Audience Award Dramatic – Spanking the Monkey
Audience Award Documentary – Hoop Dreams
Excellence in Cinematography Award Dramatic – Suture
Excellence in Cinematography Award Documentary – Colorado Cowboy: The Bruce Ford Story
Freedom of Expression Award – Dialogues with Madwomen
Freedom of Expression Award – Heart of the Matter
Special Jury Recognition – Coming Out Under Fire
Special Jury Recognition for Acting – Alicia Witt, Renee Humphrey for Fun 
Piper-Heidsieck Tribute to Independent Vision – Gena Rowlands
Source:

1995
Grand Jury Prize Dramatic – The Brothers McMullen
Grand Jury Prize Dramatic – The Young Poisoner's Handbook
Grand Jury Prize Documentary – Crumb
Filmmakers Trophy Dramatic – Angela
Filmmakers Trophy Documentary – Black is... Black Ain't
Audience Award Dramatic – Picture Bride 
Audience Award Documentary – Ballot Measure 9 and Unzipped
Waldo Salt Screenwriting Award – Living in Oblivion
Freedom of Expression Award – When Billy Broke His Head...and Other Tales of Wonder
Special Jury Recognition for Directing – Jupiter's Wife
Special Jury Recognition for Directing – Heavy
Special Jury Recognition for Directing – Rhythm Thief
Special Jury Recognition – El héroe
Honorable Mention Latin American Cinema – Eagles Don't Hunt Flies
Honorable Mention Latin American Cinema – Strawberry and Chocolate
Honorable Mention Short Filmmaking – The Salesman and Other Adventures
Honorable Mention Short Filmmaking – Tom's Flesh
Honorable Mention Short Filmmaking – Nonnie & Alex
Piper-Heidsieck Tribute to Independent Vision – Nicolas Cage
Source:

1996
Grand Jury Prize Dramatic – Welcome to the Dollhouse
Grand Jury Prize Documentary – Troublesome Creek: A Midwestern
Filmmakers Trophy Dramatic – Girls Town
Audience Award Dramatic – Care of the Spitfire Grill
Audience Award Documentary – Troublesome Creek: A Midwestern
Excellence in Cinematography Award Dramatic – Color of a Brisk and Leaping Day
Excellence in Cinematography Award Documentary – Cutting Loose
Waldo Salt Screenwriting Award – Big Night
Freedom of Expression Award – The Celluloid Closet
Special Jury Recognition – When We Were Kings
Special Jury Prize for Acting – Lili Taylor for I Shot Andy Warhol
Honorable Mention Latin American Cinema – Guantanamera
Honorable Mention Latin American Cinema – Wild Horses
Honorable Mention Short Filmmaking – Pig!
Honorable Mention Short Filmmaking – Dry Mount
Piper-Heidsieck Tribute to Independent Vision – Dianne Wiest
Sources:

1997
Grand Jury Prize Dramatic – Sunday
Grand Jury Prize Documentary – Girls Like Us
Audience Award Dramatic – Love Jones
Audience Award Dramatic – Hurricane
Audience Award Documentary – Paul Monette: The Brink of Summer's End
Filmmakers Trophy Documentary – Licensed to Kill
Filmmakers Trophy Dramatic – In the Company of Men
Freedom of Expression Award – Family Name
Freedom of Expression Award – Fear and Learning at Hoover Elementary
Excellence in Cinematography Award Documentary – My America ...or Honk if You Love Buddha
Special Jury Recognition – Kirby Dick for  SICK: The Life & Death of Bob Flanagan, Supermasochist / Parker Posey for The House of Yes
Latin American Cinema Award – Landscapes of Memory
Short Filmmaking Award – Man About Town
Honorable Mention Latin American Cinema – Deep Crimson
Honorable Mention Latin American Cinema – Syphon Gun
Honorable Mention Short Filmmaking – Birdhouse
Piper-Heidsieck Tribute to Independent Vision – Tim Robbins
Source:

1998
Grand Jury Prize Dramatic – Slam
Grand Jury Prize Documentary – Frat House (tie)
Grand Jury Prize Documentary – The Farm: Angola, USA (tie)
Special Jury Prize for Acting – Miss Monday
Special Jury Prize Short Filmmaking – Fishbelly White
Filmmakers Trophy Dramatic – Smoke Signals
Filmmakers Trophy Documentary – Divine Trash
Directing Award Dramatic – Pi
Directing Award Documentary – Moment of Impact
Excellence in Cinematography Award Dramatic – 2by4
Excellence in Cinematography Award Documentary – Wild Man Blues
Waldo Salt Screenwriting Award – High Art
Freedom of Expression Award – The Decline of Western Civilization III
Honorable Mention Latin American Cinema – Who the Hell Is Juliette?
Audience Award Dramatic – Smoke Signals
Audience Award Documentary – Out of the Past
Honorable Mention Short Filmmaking – Snake Feed
Honorable Mention Short Filmmaking – Human Remains
Piper-Heidseick Tribute to Independent Vision – Frances McDormand
Source:

1999
Grand Jury Prize Documentary – American Movie
Grand Jury Prize Dramatic – Three Seasons
Audience Award Documentary – Genghis Blues
Audience Award Dramatic – Three Seasons
Excellence in Cinematography Award Dramatic – Three Seasons
Excellence in Cinematography Award Documentary – Regret to Inform
Excellence in Cinematography Award Documentary – Rabbit in the Moon
Directing Award Dramatic – Judy Berlin
Directing Award Documentary – Regret to Inform
Freedom of Expression Award – The Black Press: Soldiers Without Swords
Waldo Salt Screenwriting Award – Joe the King (tie)
Waldo Salt Screenwriting Award – Guinevere (tie)
World Cinema Audience Award – Run Lola Run (tie)
World Cinema Audience Award – Train of Life (tie)
Filmmakers Trophy Dramatic – Tumbleweeds
Filmmakers Trophy Documentary – Sing Faster: The Stagehands' Ring Cycle
Honorable Mention Short Filmmaking – Stubble Trouble
Honorable Mention Short Filmmaking – Come unto Me: The Faces of Tyree Guyton
Honorable Mention Short Filmmaking – A Pack of Gifts, Now
Honorable Mention Short Filmmaking – Atomic Tabasco
Honorable Mention Short Filmmaking – Devil Doll/Ring Pull
Jury Prize Latin American Cinema – Little Saints
Jury Prize Short Filmmaking – More
Special Jury Prize – On the Ropes
Special Jury Prize Latin American Cinema – Life is to Whistle
Special Jury Prize for Acting – Happy, Texas
Special Jury Prize for Distinctive Vision in Filmmaking – Treasure Island
Piper-Heidsieck tribute to Independent Vision – Laura Dern
Source:

2000s

2000
Grand Jury Prize Documentary – Long Night's Journey into Day
Grand Jury Prize Dramatic – Girlfight & You Can Count on Me (tie)
Directing Award Dramatic – Girlfight
Directing Award Documentary – Paragraph 175
Waldo Salt Screenwriting Award – You Can Count on Me
Freedom of Expression Award – Dark Days
Audience Award Dramatic – Two Family House
Excellence in Cinematography Award Documentary – Americanos: Latino Life in The United States
Excellence in Cinematography Award Dramatic – Committed
World Cinema Audience Award – Saving Grace
Special Jury Prize for Artistic Achievement – The Ballad of Ramblin' Jack
Special Jury Prize for Writing – George Wallace: Settin' the Woods on Fire
Special Jury Prize for Ensemble Cast – The Tao of Steve
Special Jury Prize for Ensemble Cast – Songcatcher
Jury Prize Latin American Cinema – Herod's Law
Jury Prize Short Filmmaking – Five Feet High and Rising
Honorable Mention Short Filmmaking – No One Writes to the Colonel
Honorable Mention Short Filmmaking – Darling International
Honorable Mention Short Filmmaking – G.
Piper-Heidsieck tribute to Independent Vision – Kevin Spacey
Source:

2001
Grand Jury Prize Documentary – Southern Comfort
Grand Jury Prize Dramatic – The Believer
Audience Award Dramatic – Hedwig and the Angry Inch
Audience Award Documentary – Dogtown and Z-Boys & Scout's Honor
Directing Award Documentary – Dogtown and Z-Boys
Directing Award Dramatic – Hedwig and the Angry Inch
Freedom of Expression Award – Scout's Honor
World Cinema Audience Award – The Road Home
Excellence in Cinematography Award Documentary – LaLee's Kin: The Legacy of Cotton
Excellence in Cinematography Award Dramatic – The Deep End
Waldo Salt Screenwriting Award – Memento
Special Jury Prize for Acting – In the Bedroom
Special Jury Prize Documentary – Children Underground
Jury Prize Latin American Cinema – Possible Loves
Jury Prize Latin American Cinema – Sin Dejar Huella (English title Without a Trace)
Special Jury Prize Latin American Cinema – Coffin Joe - The Strange World Of José Mojica Marins
Jury Prize in Short Filmmaking – Gina, An Actress, Age 29
Honorable Mention Short Filmmaking – Delusions in Modern Primitivism
Honorable Mention Short Filmmaking – Jigsaw Venus
Honorable Mention Short Filmmaking – Metropopular
Honorable Mention Short Filmmaking – Peter Rabbit and the Crucifix
Honorable Mention Short Filmmaking – Pie Fight '69
Honorable Mention Short Filmmaking – Sweet
Honorable Mention Short Filmmaking – Zen and the Art of Landscaping
Piper-Heidsieck Award – Julianne Moore
Source:

2002
Audience Award Documentary – Amandla!: A Revolution in Four-Part Harmony
Audience Award Dramatic – Real Women Have Curves
Directing Award Documentary – Sister Helen
Directing Award Dramatic – Tadpole
Excellence in Cinematography Award Documentary – Blue Vinyl
Excellence in Cinematography Award Dramatic – Personal Velocity: Three Portraits
Freedom of Expression Award – Amandla!: A Revolution in Four-Part Harmony
Grand Jury Prize Documentary – Daughter from Danang
Grand Jury Prize Dramatic – Personal Velocity: Three Portraits
Honorable Mention Short Filmmaking – No Dumb Questions
Honorable Mention Short Filmmaking – The Parlor
Honorable Mention Short Filmmaking – Stuck
Honorable Mention Short Filmmaking – Drowning Lessons
Honorable Mention Short Filmmaking – Bus 44
Honorable Mention Short Filmmaking – Morning Breath
Jury Prize Latin American Cinema – The Trespasser
Jury Prize Short Filmmaking – Gasline
Special Jury Prize Documentary – Senorita Extraviada
Special Jury Prize Documentary – How to Draw a Bunny
Special Jury Prize for Ensemble Cast – Manito
Special Jury Prize for Originality – Secretary
Waldo Salt Screenwriting Award – Love Liza
World Cinema Audience Award – L'ultimo bacio
World Cinema Audience Award – Bloody Sunday
Source:

2003
Alfred P. Sloan Prize – Dopamine
Audience Award Documentary – My Flesh and Blood
Audience Award Dramatic – The Station Agent
Directing Award Dramatic – thirteen
Excellence in Cinematography Award Documentary – Stevie
Excellence in Cinematography Award Dramatic – Quattro Noza
Freedom of Expression Award – What I Want My Words to Do to You
Grand Jury Prize Documentary – Capturing the Friedmans
Grand Jury Prize Dramatic – American Splendor
Honorable Mention Short Filmmaking – Ocularist
Honorable Mention Short Filmmaking – The Planets
Honorable Mention Short Filmmaking – Pan with Us
Honorable Mention Short Filmmaking – The Freak
Honorable Mention Short Filmmaking – Asylum
Honorable Mention Short Filmmaking – Fits & Starts
Honorable Mention Short Filmmaking – Earthquake
Honorable Mention Short Filmmaking – From the 104th Floor
Jury Prize Short Filmmaking – Terminal Bar
Online Film Festival Audience Award Short Filmmaking – One
Online Film Festival Audience Award Short Filmmaking Animation – Broken Saints
Online Film Festival Second Place Audience Award Short Filmmaking – S-11 Redux: Channel Surfing the Apocalypse
Online Film Festival Second Place Audience Award Short Filmmaking Animation – LOR
Online Film Festival Third Place Audience Award Short Filmmaking – Icarus of Pittsburgh
Online Film Festival Third Place Audience Award Short Filmmaking Animation – Bumble Beeing
Waldo Salt Screenwriting Award – The Station Agent
World Cinema Audience Award – Whale Rider
Source:

2004
Alfred P. Sloan Prize – Primer
Audience Award Documentary – Born into Brothels
Audience Award Dramatic – Maria Full of Grace
Directing Award Documentary – Super Size Me
Directing Award Dramatic – Down to the Bone
Excellence in Cinematography Award Documentary – Imelda
Excellence in Cinematography Award Dramatic – November
Freedom of Expression Award – Repatriation
Grand Jury Prize Documentary – Dig!
Grand Jury Prize Dramatic – Primer
Honorable Mention in Short Filmmaking – Curtis
Honorable Mention in Short Filmmaking – Harvie Krumpet
Honorable Mention in Short Filmmaking – Krumped
Honorable Mention in Short Filmmaking – Papillon D’Amour
Honorable Mention in Short Filmmaking – Spokane
Jury Prize in Short Filmmaking – When the Storm Came
Jury Prize in Short Filmmaking – Gowanus, Brooklyn
Jury Prize in International Short Filmmaking – Tomo
Online Film Festival Audience Award Short Filmmaking – Strangers
Online Film Festival Audience Award Short Filmmaking Animation – Drum Machine
Online Film Festival Jury Award Short Filmmaking – Wet Dreams and False Images
Online Film Festival Jury Award Short Filmmaking Animation – Bathtime in Clerkenwell
Online Film Festival Jury Award Short Filmmaking New Forms – The Dawn at My Back: Memoir of a Texas Upgringing
Special Jury Prize Documentary – Farmingville
Special Jury Prize Dramatic – Brother to Brother
Special Jury Prize for Acting – Vera Farmiga for her performance in Down to the Bone
Waldo Salt Screenwriting Award – Larry Gross for We Don't Live Here Anymore
World Cinema Audience Award Documentary – The Corporation
World Cinema Audience Award Dramatic – Seducing Doctor Lewis
Source:

2005
Special Jury Prize for Editing – Murderball
Audience Award Documentary – Murderball
Audience Award Dramatic – Hustle & Flow
Directing Award Documentary – Jeff Feuerzeig for The Devil and Daniel Johnston
Directing Award Dramatic – Noah Baumbach for The Squid and the Whale
Excellence in Cinematography Award Documentary – The Education of Shelby Knox
Excellence in Cinematography Award Dramatic – Hustle & Flow
Grand Jury Prize Documentary – Why We Fight
Grand Jury Prize Dramatic – Forty Shades of Blue
Honorable Mention in Short Filmmaking – One Weekend A Month
Honorable Mention in Short Filmmaking – Small Town Secrets
Honorable Mention in Short Filmmaking – Victoria Para Chino
Honorable Mention in Short Filmmaking – Tama Tu
Honorable Mention in Short Filmmaking – Ryan
Honorable Mention in Short Filmmaking – Bullets in the Hood: A Bed-Stuy Story
Jury Prize in Short Filmmaking – Family Portrait
Jury Prize in International Short Filmmaking – Wasp
Special Jury Prize Documentary – After Innocence
Special Jury Prize for Acting – Amy Adams in Junebug
Special Jury Prize for Acting – Lou Pucci in Thumbsucker
Special Jury Prize for Originality of Vision Dramatic – Miranda July writer, director, and actor in Me and You and Everyone We Know
Special Jury Prize for Originality of Vision Dramatic – Rian Johnson director of Brick
Waldo Salt Screenwriting Award – Noah Baumbach for The Squid and the Whale
World Cinema Jury Prize Documentary – Shape of the Moon
World Cinema Jury Prize Dramatic – The Hero
World Cinema Audience Award Dramatic – Brothers
World Cinema Special Jury Prize Documentary – The Liberace of Baghdad
World Cinema Special Jury Prize Documentary – Wall
World Cinema Special Jury Prize Dramatic – The Forest For the Trees
World Cinema Special Jury Prize Dramatic – Live-In Maid
Source:

2006
2006 Alfred P. Sloan Prize – The House of Sand
Audience Award Documentary – God Grew Tired of Us
Audience Award Dramatic – Quinceañera
Directing Award Documentary – James Longley for Iraq in Fragments
Directing Award Dramatic – Dito Montiel for A Guide to Recognizing Your Saints
Editing Award Documentary – Iraq in Fragments
Excellence in Cinematography Award Documentary – James Longley for Iraq in Fragments
Excellence in Cinematography Award Dramatic – Tom Richmond for Right at Your Door
Grand Jury Prize Documentary – God Grew Tired of Us
Grand Jury Prize Dramatic – Quinceañera
Honorable Mention in Short Filmmaking – Before Dawn
Honorable Mention in Short Filmmaking – Undressing My Mother
Jury Prize in Short Filmmaking – Bugcrush
Jury Prize in Short Filmmaking – The Wraith of Cobble Hill
Jury Prize in International Short Filmmaking – The Natural Route
Special Jury Prize Documentary – American Blackout
Special Jury Prize Documentary – TV Junkie
Special Jury Prize for Independent Vision Dramatic – In Between Days
Waldo Salt Screenwriting Award – Hilary Brougher for Stephanie Daley
World Cinema Audience Award Documentary – De Nadie
World Cinema Audience Award Dramatic – No. 2
World Cinema Jury Prize Documentary – In the Pit
World Cinema Jury Prize Dramatic – 13 Tzameti
World Cinema Special Jury Prize Documentary – Into Great Silence
World Cinema Special Jury Prize Documentary – Dear Pyongyang 
World Cinema Special Jury Prize Dramatic – Eve and the Fire Horse
Source:

2007
2007 Alfred P. Sloan Prize – Dark Matter
Audience Award: Documentary – Hear and Now
Audience Award: Dramatic – Grace Is Gone
Directing Award Documentary – Sean Fine and Andrea Nix Fine for War/Dance
Directing Award Dramatic – Jeffrey Blitz for Rocket Science
Editing Award Documentary – Hibah Sherif Frisina, Charlton McMillan, and Michael Schweitzer for Nanking
Excellence in Cinematography Award Documentary – Manda Bala (Send a Bullet)
Excellence in Cinematography Award Dramatic – Benoît Debie for Joshua
Grand Jury Prize Documentary – Manda Bala (Send a Bullet)
Grand Jury Prize Dramatic – Padre Nuestro
Honorable Mentions in Short Filmmaking – Death to the Tinman
Honorable Mentions in Short Filmmaking – t.o.m.
Honorable Mentions in Short Filmmaking – Men Understand Each Other Better (Mardha Hamdigar Ra Behtar Mifahmand)
Honorable Mentions in Short Filmmaking – Spitfire 944
Honorable Mentions in Short Filmmaking – Motodrom
Honorable Mentions in Short Filmmaking – The Fighting Cholitas
Jury Prize in Short Filmmaking – Everything Will Be OK
Jury Prize in International Short Filmmaking – The Tube With a Hat
Special Jury Prize: Documentary – No End in Sight
Special Jury Prize in Short Filmmaking – Freeheld
Special Jury Prize for Acting – Jess Weixler in Teeth
Special Jury Prize for Acting – Tamara Podemski in Four Sheets to the Wind
Special Jury Prize for Singularity of Vision Dramatic –  Chris Smith, director of The Pool
Waldo Salt Screenwriting Award: Dramatic – James C. Strouse for Grace Is Gone
World Cinema Audience Award: Documentary – In the Shadow of the Moon
World Cinema Audience Award: Dramatic – Once
World Cinema Jury Prize Documentary – Enemies of Happiness
World Cinema Jury Prize Dramatic – Sweet Mud
World Cinema Special Jury Prize Documentary – Hot House
World Cinema Special Jury Prize Dramatic – L' Héritage (The Legacy)
Source:

2008
Alfred P. Sloan Feature Film Prize – Sleep Dealer
Audience Award: Documentary – Fuel
Audience Award: Dramatic – The Wackness
Directing Award: Documentary – American Teen
Directing Award: Dramatic – Ballast
Editing Award Documentary – Roman Polanski: Wanted and Desired
Excellence in Cinematography Award: Documentary – Patti Smith: Dream of Life
Excellence in Cinematography Award: Dramatic – Ballast
Grand Jury Prize: Documentary – Trouble the Water
Grand Jury Prize: Dramatic – Frozen River
Honorable Mention in Short Filmmaking – Aquarium
Honorable Mention in Short Filmmaking – August 15th
Honorable Mention in Short Filmmaking – La Corona (The Crown)
Honorable Mention in Short Filmmaking – Oiran Lyrics
Honorable Mention in Short Filmmaking – Spider
Honorable Mention in Short Filmmaking – Suspension
Honorable Mention in Short Filmmaking – W.
Jury Prize Short Filmmaking – My Olympic Summer
Jury Prize Short Filmmaking – Sikumi (On the Ice)
Jury Prize International Short Filmmaking – Soft
Special Jury Prize: Documentary – The Greatest Silence: Rape in the Congo
Special Jury Prize for Spirit of Independence – Anywhere, U.S.A.
Special Jury Prize for Ensemble Cast – Choke
Waldo Salt Screenwriting Award – Sleep Dealer
World Cinema Audience Award: Dramatic – Captain Abu Raed
World Cinema Cinematography Award Documentary  – Recycle
World Cinema Directing Award Documentary – Durakovo: The Village of Fools (Durakovo: Le Village Des Fous)
World Cinema Directing Award Dramatic – Mermaid (Rusalka)
World Cinema Documentary Editing Award – The Art Star and the Sudanese Twins
World Cinema Jury Prize Documentary – Man on Wire
World Cinema Jury Prize Dramatic – King of Ping Pong (Ping Pongkingen)
World Cinema Screenwriting Award – I Always Wanted to Be a Gangster (J'ai Toujours Rêvé d'Être un Gangster)
World Cinema Special Jury Prize: Dramatic – Blue Eyelids (Párpados Azules)
Source:

2009
2009 Alfred P. Sloan Prize – Adam
Audience Award: Dramatic – Precious: Based on the Novel "Push" by Sapphire
Audience Award: Documentary – The Cove
Directing Award Dramatic – Cary Joji Fukunaga for Sin Nombre
Directing Award Documentary – Natalia Almada for El General
Excellence in Cinematography Award: Dramatic – Adriano Goldman for Sin Nombre
Excellence in Cinematography Award: Documentary – Bob Richman for The September Issue
Editing Award Documentary – Karen Schmeer for Sergio
Grand Jury Prize: Dramatic – Precious: Based on the Novel "Push" by Sapphire
Grand Jury Prize: Documentary – We Live in Public
Honorable Mention Short Filmmaking – Omelette
Honorable Mention Short Filmmaking – The Attack of the Robots from Nebula-5
Honorable Mention Short Filmmaking – Jerrycan
Honorable Mention Short Filmmaking – Western Spaghetti
Honorable Mention Short Filmmaking – I Live in the Woods
Honorable Mention Short Filmmaking – Love You More
Honorable Mention Short Filmmaking – Protect You + Me.
Honorable Mention Short Filmmaking – Treevenge
Jury Prize Short Filmmaking – Short Term 12
Jury Prize International Short Filmmaking – Lies
Special Jury Prize Documentary – Good Hair
Special Jury Prize for Spirit of Independence – Humpday
Special Jury Prize for Acting – Mo'Nique for Precious: Based on the Novel "Push" by Sapphire
Waldo Salt Screenwriting Award: Dramatic – Nicholas Jasenovec and Charlyne Yi for Paper Heart
World Cinema Audience Award: Documentary – Afghan Star
World Cinema Audience Award: Dramatic – An Education
World Cinema Cinematography Award: Documentary  – John Maringouin for Big River Man
World Cinema Cinematography Award: Dramatic  – John De Borman for An Education
World Cinema Directing Award: Documentary  – Havana Marking for Afghan Star
World Cinema Documentary Editing Award – Janus Billeskov Jansen and Thomas Papapetros for Burma VJ
World Cinema Jury Prize Documentary – Rough Aunties
World Cinema Jury Prize Dramatic – The Maid (La Nana)
World Cinema Screenwriting Award – Guy Hibbert for Five Minutes of Heaven
World Cinema Special Jury Prize Documentary – Tibet in Song
World Cinema Special Jury Prize for Acting – Catalina Saavedra for The Maid (La Nana)
World Cinema Special Jury Prize for Originality – Louise-Michel
Source:

2010s

2010
Alfred P. Sloan Prize – Obselidia
Audience Award: Dramatic – happythankyoumoreplease
Audience Award: Documentary – Waiting for "Superman"
Best of NEXT – Homewrecker (2010 film)
Directing Award Documentary – Smash His Camera
Directing Award Dramatic – 3 Backyards
Excellence in Cinematography Award Dramatic – Obselidia
Excellence in Cinematography Award Documentary – The Oath
Editing Award Documentary – Joan Rivers: A Piece of Work
Grand Jury Prize: Documentary – Restrepo
Grand Jury Prize: Dramatic – Winter's Bone
Honorable Mention in Short Filmmaking – Born Sweet
Honorable Mention in Short Filmmaking – Can We Talk?
Honorable Mention in Short Filmmaking – Dock Ellis & The LSD No-No
Honorable Mention in Short Filmmaking – How I Met Your Father
Honorable Mention in Short Filmmaking – Quadrangle
Honorable Mention in Short Filmmaking – Rob and Valentyna in Scotland
Honorable Mention in Short Filmmaking – Young Love
Jury Prize International Short Filmmaking – The Six Dollar Fifty Man
Jury Prize Short Filmmaking – Drunk History: Douglass & Lincoln
Special Jury Prize Documentary – Gasland
Special Jury Prize Dramatic – Sympathy for Delicious
Waldo Salt Screenwriting Award – Winter's Bone
World Cinema Audience Award Documentary – Waste Land
World Cinema Audience Award Dramatic – Undertow
World Cinema Cinematography Award Documentary – His & Hers
World Cinema Cinematography Award Dramatic – The Man Next Door
World Cinema Directing Award Documentary – Space Tourists
World Cinema Directing Award Dramatic – Southern District
World Cinema Documentary Editing Award – A Film Unfinished
World Cinema Jury Prize Documentary – The Red Chapel (Det Røde Kapel)
World Cinema Jury Prize Dramatic – Animal Kingdom
World Cinema Screenwriting Award – Southern District
World Cinema Special Jury Prize Documentary – Enemies of the People
World Cinema Special Jury Prize for Acting – Grown Up Movie Star
Source:

2011
Grand Jury Prize: Documentary – How to Die in Oregon
Grand Jury Prize: Dramatic – Like Crazy
World Cinema Jury Prize: Documentary – Hell and Back Again
World Cinema Jury Prize: Dramatic – Happy, Happy
Audience Award: Documentary – Buck
Audience Award: Dramatic – Circumstance
World Cinema Audience Award: Documentary – Senna
World Cinema Audience Award: Dramatic – Kinyarwanda
Best of NEXT Audience Award – to.get.her
Directing Award: Documentary – Jon Foy for Resurrect Dead: The Mystery of the Toynbee Tiles
Directing Award: Dramatic – Sean Durkin for Martha Marcy May Marlene
World Cinema Directing Award: Documentary – James Marsh for Project Nim
World Cinema Directing Award: Dramatic – Paddy Considine for Tyrannosaur
Waldo Salt Screenwriting Award – Sam Levinson for Another Happy Day
World Cinema Dramatic Screenwriting Award – Erez Kav-El for Restoration
Documentary Editing Award – Matthew Hamachek and Marshall Curry for If a Tree Falls: A Story of the Earth Liberation Front
World Cinema Documentary Editing Award – Goran Hugo Olsson and Hanna Lejonqvist for The Black Power Mixtape 1967-1975
Excellence in Cinematography Award: Documentary – Eric Strauss, Ryan Hill and Peter Hutchens for The Redemption of General Butt Naked
Excellence in Cinematography Award: Dramatic – Bradford Young for Pariah
World Cinema Cinematography Award: Documentary – Danfung Dennis for Hell and Back Again
World Cinema Cinematography Award: Dramatic – Diego F. Jimenez for All Your Dead Ones
World Dramatic Special Jury Prizes for Breakout Performances – Peter Mullan and Olivia Colman for Tyrannosaur
World Cinema Documentary Special Jury Prize – Position Among the Stars
Documentary Special Jury Prize – Being Elmo: A Puppeteer's Journey
Dramatic Special Jury Prize – Another Earth
Dramatic Special Jury Prize for Breakout Performance – Felicity Jones for Like Crazy
Jury Prize in Short Filmmaking – Brick Novax Pt 1 and 2
International Jury Prize in Short Filmmaking – Deeper Than Yesterday
Honorable Mention in Short Filmmaking – Choke
Honorable Mention in Short Filmmaking – Diarchy
Honorable Mention in Short Filmmaking – The External World
Honorable Mention in Short Filmmaking – The Legend of Beaver Dam
Honorable Mention in Short Filmmaking – Out of Reach
Honorable Mention in Short Filmmaking – Protoparticles
Alfred P. Sloan Feature Film Prize – Another Earth
Sundance Institute/Mahindra Global Filmmaking Awards – Bogdan Mustata of Romania for Wolf,  Ernesto Contrera of Mexico for I Dream In Another Language, Seng Tat Liew of Malaysia for In What City Does It Live?, and Talya Lavie of Israel for Zero Motivation
Sundance Institute/NHK Award – Cherien Dabis, director of May in the Summer
Source:

2012
 Grand Jury Prize: Documentary – The House I Live In
 Grand Jury Prize: Dramatic – Beasts of the Southern Wild
 World Cinema Jury Prize: Documentary – The Law in These Parts
 World Cinema Jury Prize: Dramatic – Violeta Went to Heaven (Violeta se Fue a Los Cielos) 
 Audience Award: U.S. Documentary – The Invisible War
 Audience Award: U.S. Dramatic – The Surrogate (retitled The Sessions)
 World Cinema Audience Award: Documentary – Searching for Sugar Man
 World Cinema Audience Award: Dramatic – Valley of Saints
 Best of NEXT Audience Award – Sleepwalk with Me
 Alfred P. Sloan Feature Film Prize – Robot & Frank
 U.S. Directing Award: Documentary – The Queen of Versailles
 U.S. Directing Award: Dramatic – Middle of Nowhere
 World Cinema Directing Award: Documentary – 5 Broken Cameras
 World Cinema Directing Award: Dramatic – Teddy Bear
 Waldo Salt Screenwriting Award – Safety Not Guaranteed
 World Cinema Screenwriting Award – Young & Wild
 U.S. Documentary Editing Award – Detropia
 World Cinema Documentary Editing Award – Indie Game: The Movie
 Excellence in Cinematography Award: U.S. Documentary – Chasing Ice
 Excellence in Cinematography Award: U.S. Dramatic – Beasts of the Southern Wild
 World Cinema Cinematography Award: Documentary – Putin's Kiss
 World Cinema Cinematography Award: Dramatic – My Brother the Devil
 U.S. Documentary Special Jury Prize for an Agent of Change – Love Free or Die
 U.S. Documentary Special Jury Prize for Spirit of Defiance – Ai Weiwei: Never Sorry
 U.S. Dramatic Special Jury Prize for Excellence in Independent Film Producing – Smashed and Nobody Walks
 U.S. Dramatic Special Jury Prize for Ensemble Acting  – The Surrogate (retitled The Sessions)
 World Cinema Dramatic Special Jury Prize for Artistic Vision – Can
 World Cinema Documentary Special Jury Prize for its Celebration of the Artistic Spirit – Searching for Sugar Man
 Jury Prize: Short Filmmaking – Fishing Without Nets
 Short Film Audience Award – The Debutante Hunters
Source:

2013
 U. S. Grand Jury Prize: Dramatic – Fruitvale (retitled Fruitvale Station)
 U. S. Grand Jury Prize: Documentary – Blood Brother
 World Cinema Grand Jury Prize: Dramatic – Jiseul
 World Cinema Grand Jury Prize: Documentary – A River Changes Course
 Audience Award: U. S. Dramatic presented by Acura – Fruitvale (retitled Fruitvale Station)
 Audience Award: U.S. Documentary presented by Acura – Blood Brother
 Audience Award: World Cinema Dramatic – Metro Manila
 Audience Award: World Cinema: Documentary – The Square
 Audience Award: Best of NEXT – This Is Martin Bonner
 Directing Award: U. S. Dramatic – Afternoon Delight
 Directing Award: U. S. Documentary – Cutie and the Boxer
 Directing Award: World Cinema Dramatic – Crystal Fairy
 Directing Award: World Cinema Documentary – The Machine Which Makes Everything Disappear
 Cinematography Award: U. S. Dramatic – Ain't Them Bodies Saints
 Cinematography Award: U. S. Dramatic – Mother of George
 Cinematography Award: U. S. Documentary – Dirty Wars: The World Is a Battlefield
 Cinematography Award: World Cinema Dramatic – Lasting
 Cinematography Award: World Cinema Documentary – Who Is Dayani Cristal?
 U. S. Documentary Special Jury Award for Achievement in Filmmaking – Inequality for All
 U. S. Documentary Special Jury Award for Achievement in Filmmaking – American Promise
 U. S. Dramatic Special Jury Award for Acting – Miles Teller & Shailene Woodley, The Spectacular Now
 U. S. Dramatic Special Jury Award for Sound Design – Shane Carruth & Johnny Marshall, Upstream Color
 World Cinema Dramatic Special Jury Award – Circles
 World Cinema Documentary Special Jury Award for Punk Spirit – Pussy Riot – A Punk Prayer
 Editing Award: U. S. Documentary – Gideon's Army
 Editing Award: World Cinema Documentary – The Summit
 Waldo Salt Screenwriting Award: U.S. Dramatic – In a World...
 Screenwriting Award: World Cinema Dramatic – Wajma (An Afghan Love Story)
 Alfred P. Sloan Feature Film Prize – Computer Chess
 Short Film Grand Jury Prize – The Whistle
 Short Film Jury Award: US Fiction – Whiplash
 Short Film Jury Award: International Fiction – The Date
 Short Film Jury Award: Non-fiction – Skinningrove
 Short Film Jury Award: Animation – Irish Folk Furniture
 Short Film Special Jury Award for Acting – Joel Nagle, Palimpsest
 Short Film Special Jury Award – Kahlil Joseph, Until the Quiet Comes
 Short Film Audience Award, Presented by YouTube – Catnip: Egress to Oblivion
Source:

2014
 Grand Jury Prize: Dramatic – Whiplash
 Directing Award: Dramatic – Fishing Without Nets
 Cinematography Award: Dramatic – Low Down
 Waldo Salt Screenwriting Award – The Skeleton Twins
 Special Jury Prize for Breakthrough Talent: Dramatic – Dear White People
 Special Jury Prize for Musical Score: Dramatic – Kumiko, the Treasure Hunter
 Grand Jury Prize: Documentary – Rich Hill
 Directing Award: Documentary – The Case Against 8
 Cinematography Award: Documentary – E-Team
 Editing Award: Documentary – Watchers of the Sky
 Special Jury Prize for Intuitive Filmmaking: Documentary – The Overnighters
 Special Jury Prize for Use of Animation: Documentary – Watchers of the Sky
 World Cinema Grand Jury Prize: Dramatic – To Kill a Man
 World Cinema Directing Award: Dramatic – 52 Tuesdays
 World Cinema Cinematography Award: Dramatic – Lilting
 World Cinema Screenwriting Award – Blind
 World Cinema Special Jury Prize: Dramatic – God Help the Girl
 World Cinema Grand Jury Prize: Documentary – Return to Homs
 World Cinema Directing Award: Documentary – 20,000 Days on Earth
 World Cinema Cinematography Award : Documentary – Happiness
 World Cinema Editing Award: Documentary – 20,000 Days on Earth
 World Cinema Special Jury Prize: Documentary – We Come as Friends
 Audience Award: Dramatic – Whiplash
 Audience Award: Documentary – Alive Inside: A Story of Music and Memory
 World Cinema Audience Award: Dramatic – Difret
 World Cinema Audience Award: Documentary – The Green Prince
 Best of NEXT Audience Award – Imperial Dreams
 Short Filmmaking Audience Award – Chapel Perilous
 Short Film Grand Jury Prize – Of God and Dogs
 Short Film Jury Award: Animation – Yearbook
 Short Film Jury Award: International – The Cut
 Short Film Jury Award: Non-Fiction – I Think This Is the Closest to How the Footage Looked
 Short Film Jury Award: U.S. Fiction – Gregory Go Boom
 Special Jury Prize for Unique Vision: Short Filmmaking – Rat Pack Rat
 Special Jury Prize for Non-Fiction: Short Filmmaking – Love. Love. Love.
 Alfred P. Sloan Prize – I Origins
Source:

2015
 Grand Jury Prize: Dramatic – Me and Earl and the Dying Girl by Alfonso Gomez-Rejon
 Directing Award: Dramatic – Robert Eggers for The Witch
 Cinematography Award: Dramatic – Brandon Trost for The Diary of a Teenage Girl
 Editing Award: Dramatic – Lee Haugen for Dope
 Waldo Salt Screenwriting Award – Tim Talbott for The Stanford Prison Experiment
 Special Jury Prize for Collaborative Vision: Dramatic – Jennifer Phang and Jacqueline Kim for Advantageous
 Grand Jury Prize: Documentary – The Wolfpack by Crystal Moselle
 Directing Award: Documentary – Matthew Heineman for Cartel Land
 Cinematography Award: Documentary – Matthew Heineman and Matt Porwoll for Cartel Land
 Special Jury Prize for Breakout First Feature: Documentary – Lyric R. Cabral and David Felix Sutcliffe for (T)error
 Special Jury Prize for Verité Filmmaking: Documentary – Western by Bill and Turner Ross
 Special Jury Prize for Social Impact: Documentary – 3½ Minutes by Marc Silver
 World Cinema Grand Jury Prize: Dramatic – Slow West by John Maclean
 World Cinema Directing Award: Dramatic – Alantė Kavaitė for The Summer of Sangailé
 World Cinema Cinematography Award: Dramatic – Germain McMicking for Partisan
 World Cinema Special Jury Prize for Acting: Dramatic – Regina Casé and Camila Márdila for The Second Mother
 World Cinema Special Jury Prize for Acting: Dramatic – Jack Reynor for Glassland
 World Cinema Grand Jury Prize: Documentary – The Russian Woodpecker by Chad Gracia
 World Cinema Directing Award: Documentary – Kim Longinotto for Dreamcatcher
 World Cinema Editing Award: Documentary – Jim Scott for How to Change the World
 World Cinema Special Jury Prize for Impact: Documentary – Pervert Park by Frida and Lasse Barkfors
 World Cinema Special Jury Prize for Unparalleled Access: Documentary – The Chinese Mayor by Hao Zhou
 Audience Award: Dramatic – Me and Earl and the Dying Girl by Alfonso Gomez-Rejon
 Audience Award: Documentary – Meru by Jimmy Chin and Elizabeth Chai Vasarhelyi
 World Cinema Audience Award: Dramatic – Umrika by Prashant Nair
 World Cinema Audience Award: Documentary – Dark Horse by Louise Osmond
 Best of NEXT Audience Award – James White by Josh Mond
 Short Film Grand Jury Prize – World of Tomorrow by Don Hertzfeldt
 Short Film Jury Award: Animation – Storm hits jacket by Paul Cabon
 Short Film Jury Award: International – Oh Lucy! by Atsuko Hirayanagi
 Short Film Jury Award: Non-Fiction – The Face of Ukraine: Casting Oksana Baiul by Kitty Green
 Short Film Jury Award: U.S. Fiction – SMILF by Frankie Shaw
 Special Jury Prize for Acting: Short Filmmaking – Laure Calamy for Back Alley by Cécile Ducrocq
 Special Jury Prize for Visual Poetry: Short Filmmaking – Object by Paulina Skibińska
 Alfred P. Sloan Prize – The Stanford Prison Experiment
Source:

2016
 Grand Jury Prize: Dramatic – The Birth of a Nation by Nate Parker
 Directing Award: Dramatic – Daniel Scheinert and Daniel Kwan for Swiss Army Man
 Waldo Salt Screenwriting Award – Chad Hartigan for Morris From America
 U.S. Dramatic Special Jury Award – Miles Joris-Peyrafitte for As You Are
 U.S. Dramatic Special Jury Award for Breakthrough Performance – Joe Seo for Spa Night
 U.S. Dramatic Special Jury Award for Individual Performance – Melanie Lynskey for The Intervention and Craig Robinson for Morris from America
 Grand Jury Prize: Documentary – Weiner by Elyse Steinberg and Josh Kriegman
 Directing Award: Documentary – Roger Ross Williams for Life, Animated
 U.S. Documentary Special Jury Award for Editing – Penny Lane and Thom Stylinski for NUTS!
 Special Jury Prize for Social Impact: Documentary – Trapped by Dawn Porter
 U.S. Documentary Special Jury Award for Writing – Robert Greene for Kate Plays Christine
 Special Jury Prize for Verité Filmmaking: Documentary – The Bad Kids by Keith Fulton and Lou Pepe
 World Cinema Grand Jury Prize: Dramatic – Sand Storm by Elite Zexer
 World Cinema Directing Award: Dramatic – Felix van Groeningen for Belgica
 World Cinema Dramatic Special Jury Award for Acting – Vicky Hernandez and Manolo Cruz for Between Land and Sea
 World Cinema Dramatic Special Jury Award for Screenwriting – Ana Katz and Inés Bortagaray for Mi Amiga del Parque
 World Cinema Dramatic Special Jury Award for Unique Vision & Design – The Lure by Agnieszka Smoczyńska
 World Cinema Jury Prize: Documentary – Sonita by Rokhsareh Ghaemmaghami
 World Cinema Directing Award: Documentary – Michal Marczak for All These Sleepless Nights
 World Cinema Documentary Special Jury Award for Best Debut Feature – Heidi Brandenburg and Mathew Orzel for When Two Worlds Collide
 World Cinema Documentary Special Jury Award for Best Cinematography – Pieter-Jan De Pue for The Land of the Enlightened
 World Cinema Editing Award: Documentary – Mako Kamitsuna and John Maringouin for We Are X
 Audience Award: Dramatic – The Birth of a Nation by Nate Parker
 Audience Award: Documentary – Jim: The James Foley Story by Brian Oakes
 World Cinema Audience Award: Dramatic – Between Sea and Land by Manolo Cruz and Carlos del Castillo
 World Cinema Audience Award: Documentary – Sonita by Rokhsareh Ghaemmaghami
 Best of NEXT Audience Award – First Girl I Loved by Kerem Sanga
 Short Film Grand Jury Prize – Thunder Road by Jim Cummings
 Short Film Jury Award: US Fiction – The Procedure by Calvin Lee Reeder
 Short Film Jury Award: International Fiction – Maman(s) by Maïmouna Doucouré
 Short Film Jury Award: Non-fiction – Bacon & God's Wrath by Sol Friedman
 Short Film Jury Award: Animation – Edmond by Nina Gantz
 Short Film Special Jury Award for Outstanding Performance – Grace Glowicki for Her Friend Adam
 Short Film Special Jury Award for Best Direction – Ondřej Hudeček for Peacock
 Alfred P. Sloan Prize – Embrace of the Serpent by Ciro Guerra
Source:

2017
 Grand Jury Prize: Dramatic – I Don't Feel at Home in This World Anymore by Macon Blair
 Audience Award: Dramatic – Crown Heights by Matt Ruskin
 Directing Award: Dramatic – Eliza Hittman for Beach Rats
 Waldo Salt Screenwriting Award – David Branson Smith and Matt Spicer for Ingrid Goes West
 U.S. Dramatic Special Jury Award for Breakthrough Performance – Chanté Adams for Roxanne Roxanne
 U.S. Dramatic Special Jury Award for Breakthrough Director – Maggie Betts for Novitiate
 U.S. Dramatic Special Jury Award for Cinematography – Daniel Landin for The Yellow Birds
 Grand Jury Prize: Documentary – Dina by Dan Sickles and Antonio Santini
 Directing Award: Documentary – Peter Nicks for The Force
 U.S. Documentary Orwell Award - Icarus by Bryan Fogel
 U.S. Documentary Special Jury Award for Editing – Kim Roberts and Emiliano Battista for Unrest
 U.S. Documentary Special Jury Award for Storytelling – Yance Ford for Strong Island
 U.S. Documentary Special Jury Award for Inspirational Filmmaking – Amanda Lipitz for Step
 World Cinema Grand Jury Prize: Dramatic – The Nile Hilton Incident by Tarik Saleh
 World Cinema Directing Award: Dramatic – Francis Lee for God's Own Country
 World Cinema Dramatic Special Jury Award for Screenwriting – Kirsten Tan for Pop Aye
 World Cinema Dramatic Special Jury Award for Cinematic Visions – Geng Jun for Free and Easy
 World Cinema Dramatic Special Jury Award for Cinematography – Manuel Dacosse for Axolotl Overkill
 World Cinema Jury Prize: Documentary – Last Men in Aleppo by Feras Fayyad
 World Cinema Directing Award: Documentary – Pascale Lamche for Winnie
 World Cinema Documentary Special Jury Award for Masterful Storytelling – Catherine Bainbridge and Alfonso Maiorana for Rumble: The Indians Who Rocked the World
 World Cinema Documentary Special Jury Award for Best Cinematography – Rodrigo Trejo Villanueva for Machines
 World Cinema Documentary Special Jury Award for Editing – Ramona S. Diaz for Motherland
 Audience Award: Documentary – Chasing Coral by Jeff Orlowski
 World Cinema Audience Award: Dramatic – I Dream in Another Language by Ernesto Contreras
 World Cinema Audience Award: Documentary – Joshua: Teenager vs. Superpower by Joe Piscatella
 Best of NEXT Audience Award – Gook by Justin Chon
 Alfred P. Sloan Prize – Marjorie Prime by Michael Almereyda
 Short Film Grand Jury Prize - And so we put goldfish in the pool by Makoto Nagahisa
 Short Film Jury Award: U.S. Fiction - Lucia, Before and After by Anu Valia
 Short Film Jury Award: International Fiction - And The Whole Sky Fit In The Dead Cow's Eye by Francisca Alegría
 Short Film Jury Award: Nonfiction - Alone by Garrett Bradley
 Short Film Jury Award: Animation - Broken – The Women's Prison at Hoheneck by Volker Schlecht, Alexander Lahl, and Max Mönch
 Short Film Special Jury Award for Cinematography - Dadyaa — The Woodpeckers of Rotha by Pooja Gurung, Bibhusan Basnet, and Chintan Rajbhandari
 Short Film Special Jury Award for Editing - Laps by Charlotte Wells and Blair McClendon

Source:

2018

 U.S. Dramatic Grand Jury Prize Award: The Miseducation of Cameron Post, directed by Desiree Akhavan
 U.S. Dramatic Audience Award: Burden, directed by Andrew Heckler
 U.S. Dramatic Directing Award: The Kindergarten Teacher, directed by Sara Colangelo
 U.S. Dramatic Waldo Salt Screenwriting Award: Nancy, written by Christina Choe
 U.S. Dramatic Special Jury Award for Outstanding First Feature: Monsters and Men, directed by Reinaldo Marcus Green
 U.S. Dramatic Special Jury Award for Excellence in Filmmaking: I Think We're Alone Now, directed by Reed Morano
 U.S. Dramatic Special Jury Award for Achievement in Acting: Benjamin Dickey, Blaze
 U.S. Documentary Grand Jury Prize Award: Kailash (later released as The Price of Free), directed by Derek Doneen
 U.S. Documentary Audience Award: The Sentence, directed by Rudy Valdez
 U.S. Documentary Directing Award, On Her Shoulders, directed by Alexandria Bombach
 U.S. Documentary Special Jury Award for Social Impact: Crime + Punishment, directed by Stephen Maing
 U.S. Documentary Special Jury Award for Creative Vision: Hale County This Morning, This Evening, directed by RaMell Ross
 U.S. Documentary Special Jury Award for Breakthrough Filmmaking: Minding the Gap, directed by Bing Liu
 U.S. Documentary Special Jury Award for Storytelling: Three Identical Strangers, directed by Tim Wardle
 World Cinema Dramatic Grand Jury Prize: Butterflies, directed by Tolga Karacelik
 World Cinema Dramatic Audience Award: The Guilty, directed by Gustav Moller
 World Cinema Dramatic Directing Award: And Breathe Normally, directed by Ísold Uggadóttir
 World Cinema Dramatic Special Jury Award for Acting: Valeria Bertuccelli, The Queen of Fear
 World Cinema Dramatic Special Jury Award for Screenwriting: Time Share (Tiempo Compartido), written by Julio Chavezmontes and Sebastián Hofmann
 World Cinema Dramatic Special Jury Award for Ensemble Acting: Dead Pigs, directed by Cathy Yan
 World Cinema Documentary Grand Jury Prize: Of Fathers and Sons, directed by Talal Derki
 World Cinema Documentary Audience Award: This Is Home, directed by Alexandra Shiva
 World Cinema Documentary Directing Award: Shirkers, directed by Sandi Tan
 World Cinema Documentary Special Jury Award: Matangi/Maya/M.I.A., presented to director Stephen Loveridge and M.I.A.
 World Cinema Documentary Special Jury Award for Cinematography: Genesis 2.0, Peter Indergand and Maxim Arbugaev
 World Cinema Documentary Special Jury Award for Editing: Our New President, Maxim Pozdorovkin and Matvey Kulakov
 NEXT Audience Award: Searching, directed by Aneesh Chaganty
 NEXT Innovator Award: (tie) Night Comes On, directed by Jordana Spiro; We the Animals, directed by Jeremiah Zagar
 Short Film Grand Jury Prize: Matria, directed by Alvaro Gago
 Short Film Jury Award: U.S. Fiction: Hair Wolf, directed by Mariama Diallo
 Short Film Jury Award: International Fiction: Would You Look at Her, directed by Goran Stolevski
 Short Film Jury Award: Nonfiction: The Trader (Sovdagari), directed by Tamta Gabrichidze
 Short Film Jury Award: Animation: Glucose, directed by Jeron Braxton
 Special Jury Awards: Emergency, directed by Carey Williams; Fauve, directed by Jérémy Comte; and For Nonna Anna, directed by Luis De Filippis.
 Sundance Institute Open Borders Fellowship Presented by Netflix: Of Fathers and Sons (Syria), directed by Talal Derki; Untitled film (India), directed by Chaitanya Tamhane; and Night on Fire, directed by Tatiana Huezo
 Sundance Institute / NHK Award: His House, directed by Remi Weekes.
 Sundance Institute Alfred P. Sloan Feature Film Prize: Searching, Aneesh Chaganty and Sev Ohanian
 Sundance Institute / Amazon Studios Producers Award: Sev Ohanian

2019
US Dramatic Grand Jury Prize: Clemency
US Dramatic Audience Award: Brittany Runs a Marathon
US Dramatic Directing: Joe Talbot for The Last Black Man in San Francisco
US Dramatic Waldo Salt Screenwriting Award: Pippa Bianco for Share
US Dramatic Special Jury Award for Vision and Craft: Alma Har'el for Honey Boy
US Dramatic Special Jury Award for Creative Collaboration: The Last Black Man in San Francisco
US Dramatic Special Jury Award for Breakthrough Performance: Rhianne Barreto for Share
US Documentary Grand Jury Prize: One Child Nation
US Documentary Audience Award: Knock Down the House
US Documentary Directing: Steven Bognar and Julia Reichert for American Factory
US Documentary Special Jury Award for Moral Urgency: Jacqueline Olive for Always in Season
US Documentary Special Jury Award for Emerging Filmmaker: Liza Mandelup for Jawline
US Documentary Special Jury Award for Cinematography: Luke Lorentzen for Midnight Family
World Cinema Dramatic Grand Jury Prize: The Souvenir
World Cinema Dramatic Audience Award: Queen of Hearts
World Cinema Dramatic Directing: Lucía Garibaldi for The Sharks
World Cinema Dramatic Special Jury Award: Alejandro Landes for Monos
World Cinema Dramatic Special Jury Award for Acting: Krystyna Janda for Dolce Fine Giornata
World Cinema Dramatic Special Jury Award for Originality: Makoto Nagahisa for We Are Little Zombies
World Cinema Documentary Grand Jury Prize: Honeyland
World Cinema Documentary Audience Award: Sea of Shadows
World Cinema Documentary Directing: Mads Brügger for Cold Case Hammarskjöld
World Cinema Documentary Special Jury Award for Impact for Change: Tamara Kotevska and Ljubomir Stefanov for Honeyland
World Cinema Documentary Special Jury Award for Cinematography: Fejmi Daut and Samir Ljuma for Honeyland
Short Film Grand Jury Prize: Aziza, directed by Soudade Kaadan
Short Film Jury Award: U.S. Fiction: Green, directed by Susan Andrews Correa
Short Film Jury Award: International Fiction: Dunya's Day, directed by Raed Alsemari
Short Film Jury Award: Nonfiction: Ghosts of Sugar Land, directed by Bassam Tariq
Short Film Jury Award: Animation: Reneepoptosis, directed by Renee Zhan
Special Jury Award: Directing: Alexandra Lazarowich for Fast Horse; Robert Machoian for The Minors
NEXT Audience Award: The Infiltrators
NEXT Innovator Award: The Infiltrators
Alfred P. Sloan Feature Film Prize: The Boy Who Harnessed the Wind
Sundance Institute/Amazon Studios Producers Awards: Carly Hugo & Matt Parker for Share; Sev Ohanian for Lori Cheatle
Sundance Open Borders Fellowship Presented by Netflix: Talal Derki for Of Fathers and Sons; Chaitanya Tamhane and Tatiana Huezo for Night On Fire

Source:

2020s

2020
US Dramatic Grand Jury Prize: Minari
US Dramatic Audience Award: Minari
US Dramatic Directing Award: Radha Blank for The 40-Year-Old Version
US Dramatic Waldo Salt Screenwriting Award: Edson Oda for Nine Days
US Dramatic Special Jury Award for Ensemble Cast – The cast of Charm City Kings 
US Dramatic Special Jury Award: Auteur Filmmaking – Josephine Decker for Shirley
US Dramatic Special Jury Award: Neo-Realism – Eliza Hittman for Never Rarely Sometimes Always
US Documentary Grand Jury Prize: Boys State (Jesse Moss)
US Documentary Audience Award: Crip Camp (Jim LeBrecht and Nicole Newnham)
US Documentary Directing: Garrett Bradley for Time
US Documentary Special Jury Award for Editing – Tyler H. Walk for Welcome to Chechnya
US Documentary Special Jury Award for Innovation in Non-fiction Storytelling – Kirsten Johnson for Dick Johnson Is Dead
US Documentary Special Jury Award for Emerging Filmmaker – Arthur Jones for Feels Good Man
US Documentary Special Jury Award for Social Impact Filmmaking – Eli Despres, Josh Kriegman and Elyse Steinberg for The Fight
World Cinema Dramatic Grand Jury Prize: Yalda, a Night for Forgiveness (Massoud Bakhshi)
World Cinema Dramatic Audience Award: Identifying Features (Fernanda Valadez)
World Cinema Dramatic Directing: Maïmouna Doucouré for Cuties
World Cinema Dramatic Special Jury Award for Acting – Ben Whishaw for Surge
World Cinema Dramatic Special Jury Award for Visionary Filmmaking – Lemohang Jeremiah Mosese for This Is Not a Burial, It's a Resurrection
World Cinema Dramatic Special Jury Award for Best Screenplay – Astrid Rondero and Fernanda Valadez for Identifying Features
World Cinema Documentary Grand Jury Prize: Epicentro (Hubert Sauper)
World Cinema Documentary Audience Award: The Reason I Jump (Jerry Rothwell)
World Cinema Documentary Directing: Iryna Tsilyk for The Earth Is Blue as an Orange
World Cinema Documentary Special Jury Award for Creative Storytelling – Benjamin Ree for The Painter and the Thief
World Cinema Documentary Special Jury Award for Cinematography – Radu Ciorniciuc and Mircea Topoleanu for Acasă, My Home
World Cinema Documentary Special Jury Award for Editing – Mila Aung-Thwin, Ryan Mullins and Sam Soko for Softie
Short Film Grand Jury Prize: So What if the Goats Die, directed by Sofia Alaoui
Short Film Jury Award: U.S. Fiction: Ship: A Visual Poem, directed by Terrence Daye
Short Film Jury Award: International Fiction: The Devil’s Harmony, directed by Dylan Holmes Williams
Short Film Jury Award: Nonfiction: John Was Trying to Contact Aliens, directed by Matthew Kilip
Short Film Jury Award: Animation: Daughter, directed by Daria Kashcheeva
NEXT Audience Award: I Carry You With Me (Heidi Ewing)
NEXT Innovator Award: I Carry You With Me (Heidi Ewing)
Alfred P. Sloan Feature Film Prize: Tesla (Michael Almereyda)

Source:

2021
 U.S. Grand Jury Prize: Dramatic Competition – CODA (Siân Heder)
 U.S. Grand Jury Prize: Documentary Competition – Summer of Soul (Ahmir “Questlove” Thompson)
 World Cinema Grand Jury Prize: Dramatic Competition – Hive (Blerta Basholli)
 World Cinema Grand Jury Prize: Documentary Competition – Flee (Jonas Poher Rasmussen)
 Audience Award: U.S.Dramatic – CODA (Siân Heder)
 Audience Award: U.S. Documentary – Summer of Soul (Ahmir “Questlove” Thompson)
 Audience Award: World Cinema Dramatic – Hive (Blerta Basholli)
 Audience Award: World Cinema Documentary – Writing with Fire (Rintu Thomas and Sushmit Ghosh)
 Audience Award: NEXT – Ma Belle, My Beauty (Marion Hill)
 Directing Award: U.S. Dramatic – Siân Heder for CODA
 Directing Award: U.S. Documentary – Natalia Almada for Users
 Directing Award: World Cinema Dramatic – Blerta Basholli for Hive
 Directing Award: World Cinema Documentary – Hogir Hirori for Sabaya
 Waldo Salt Screenwriting Award – Ari Katcher and Ryan Welch for On the Count of Three
 Jonathan Oppenheim Editing Award – Kristina Motwani and Rebecca Adorno for Homeroom
 NEXT Innovator Award - Dash Shaw for Cryptozoo
 U.S. Dramatic Special Jury Award for Ensemble Cast – The cast of CODA 
 U.S. Dramatic Special Jury Award: Best Actor - Clifton Collins Jr. for Jockey
 U.S. Documentary Special Jury Award: Emerging Filmmaker - Parker Hill and Isabel Bethencourt for Cusp
 U.S. Documentary Special Jury Award: Nonfiction Experimentation - Theo Anthony for All Light, Everywhere
 World Cinema Documentary Special Jury Award: Vérité Filmmaking - Camilla Nielsson for President
 World Cinema Documentary Special Jury Award: Impact for Change - Rintu Thomas and Sushmit Ghosh for Writing with Fire
 World Cinema Dramatic Special Jury Award: Acting - Jesmark Scicluna for Luzzu
 World Cinema Dramatic Special Jury Award: Creative Vision - Baz Poonpiriya for One for the Road
 Short Film Grand Jury Prize - Lizard 
 Short Film Jury Award: U.S. Fiction - The Touch of the Master's Hand 
 Short Film Jury Award: International Fiction - Bambirak 
 Short Film Jury Award: Nonfiction - Don't Go Tellin' Your Momma 
 Short Film Jury Award: Animation - Souvenir Souvenir 
 Short Film Special Jury Award for Acting - Wiggle Room 
 Short Film Special Jury Award for Screenwriting - The Criminals
 Alfred P. Sloan Feature Film Prize - Son of Monarchs
 Sundance Institute/Amazon Studios Producers Award for Nonfiction - Nicole Salazar for Philly D.A.
 Sundance Institute/Amazon Studios Producers Award for Fiction - Natalie Qasabian for Run
 Sundance Institute/Adobe Mentorship Award for Editing Nonfiction - Juli Vizza
 Sundance Institute/Adobe Mentorship Award for Editing Fiction - Terilyn Shropshire
 Sundance Institute/NHK Award - Meryam Joobeur for Motherhood
Source:

2022
 U.S. Grand Jury Prize: Dramatic Competition – Nanny (Nikyatu Jusu)
 U.S. Grand Jury Prize: Documentary Competition – The Exiles (Ben Klein and Violet Columbus)
 World Cinema Grand Jury Prize: Dramatic Competition – Utama (Alejandro Loayza Grisi)
 World Cinema Grand Jury Prize: Documentary Competition – All That Breathes (Shaunak Sen)
 Festival Favorite – Navalny (Daniel Roher)
 Audience Award: U.S. Dramatic  – Cha Cha Real Smooth (Cooper Raiff)
 Audience Award: U.S. Documentary – Navalny (Daniel Roher)
 Audience Award: World Cinema Dramatic – Girl Picture (Alli Haapasalo)
 Audience Award: World Cinema Documentary – The Territory (Alex Pritz)
 Audience Award: NEXT – Framing Agnes (Chase Joynt)
 Directing Award: U.S. Dramatic – Jamie Dack for Palm Trees and Power Lines
 Directing Award: U.S. Documentary – Reid Davenport for I Didn't See You There
 Directing Award: World Cinema Dramatic – Maryna Er Gorbach for Klondike
 Directing Award: World Cinema Documentary – Simon Lereng Wilmont for A House Made of Splinters
 Waldo Salt Screenwriting Award – K.D. Dávila for Emergency
 Jonathan Oppenheim Editing Award – Erin Casper and Jocelyne Chaput for Fire of Love
 NEXT Innovator Award – Chase Joynt for Framing Agnes
 U.S. Dramatic Special Jury Award: Ensemble Cast – The cast of 892
 U.S. Dramatic Special Jury Award: Uncompromising Artistic Vision – Bradley Rust Gray for blood 
 U.S. Documentary Special Jury Award: Creative Vision – Margaret Brown for Descendant
 U.S. Documentary Special Jury Award: Impact for Change – Paula Eiselt and Tonya Lewis Lee for Aftershock
 World Cinema Dramatic Special Jury Award: Acting – Teresa Sánchez for Dos Estaciones
 World Cinema Dramatic Special Jury Award: Innovative Spirit – Martika Ramirez Escobar for Leonor Will Never Die
 World Cinema Documentary Special Jury Award: Excellence in Verité Filmmaking – Snow Hnin Ei Hlaing for Midwives
 World Cinema Documentary Special Jury Award: Documentary Craft – Alex Pritz for The Territory
 Short Film Grand Jury Prize – The Headhunter's Daughter
 Short Film Jury Award: U.S. Fiction – If I Go Will They Miss Me
 Short Film Jury Award: International Fiction – Warsha
 Short Film Jury Award: Nonfiction – Displaced
 Short Film Jury Award: Animation – Night Bus
 Short Film Special Jury Award for Ensemble Cast – A Wild Patience Has Taken Me Here
 Short Film Special Jury Award for Screenwriting – Stranger Than Rotterdam with Sara Driver
 Alfred P. Sloan Feature Film Prize – After Yang
 Sundance Institute/Amazon Studios Producers Award for Nonfiction – Su Kim for Free Chol Soo Lee
 Sundance Institute/Amazon Studios Producers Award for Fiction – Amanda Marshall for God's Country
 Sundance Institute/Adobe Mentorship Award for Editing Nonfiction – Toby Shimin
 Sundance Institute/Adobe Mentorship Award for Editing Fiction – Dody Dorn
 Sundance Institute/NHK Award – Hasan Hadi for ''The President's Cake'

References

Sundance